Pudpadnoi Worawut; is a Thai Muay Thai fighter who competed in the 1970s. He is recognized as one of the greatest Muay Thai fighters of all time.

Biography and career

Ponn Ommklin started Muay Thai at the age of 14 in his native province of Khon Kaen, following the steps of his older brother. His parents wouldn't let him pursue Muay Thai full time before graduating high school which he did in 1969. During that period Pudpanoi competed in Isan over 60 times and went undefeated. At the age of 18 he went to Bangkok on the advice of a fighter from the Worawut camp, at this occasion Pudpadnoi used his famous ring name for the first time as he won his debut in Rajadamnern Stadium by high kick knockout. During his first two years of competition in Bangkok Pudpadnoi won 17 of 19 fights, he was a very versatile southpaw with powerful kicks earning him the nickname "The Golden Leg".

Pudpadnoi was one of the most dominant fighter in Muay Thai between 1970 and 1976, winning three Lumpinee Stadium titles. He holds victories over some of the most notable fighters of his era such as Fahsai Taweechai, Bundit Singprakarn, Vicharnnoi Porntawee, Huasai Sitiboonlert, Narongnoi Kiatbandit, Neth Saknarong, Vichit Lookbangplasoy, Sirimongkol Luksiripat and Apidej Sit-Hirun.

Pudpadnoi domination was such that at the peak of his career he was matched with opponents outweighing him by more than 10 lbs. His purses went as high as 120,000 baht. Pudpadnoi retired a first time in 1976 when he went to live in Los Angeles, following the death of his father he returned to Thailand and made a comeback in the stadiums but with little success and retired again in 1979.

In 1980 Pudapdanoi went to live in France as a trainer, he owned a gym in Paris. His most famous french student was Guillaume Kerner. In 2003 Pupadnoi went to teach in Sweden and later in the Philippines before coming back to Thailand in where he still teaches and occasionally works as a referee.

Titles and accomplishments
Lumpinee Stadium
 1971 Lumpinee Stadium 112 lbs Champion
 1971 Lumpinee Stadium 122 lbs Champion
 1973 Lumpinee Stadium 130 lbs Champion 

Rajadamnern Stadium
 1969 Rajadamnern Stadium 108 lbs Tournament Winner

Awards
 1975 King's Fighter of the Year
 1975 Prime Mnister Award
 1984 Rajadamnern Stadium Hall of Fame
 2014 Siam Kela Hall of Fame (Muay Thai)

Muay Thai record

|-  style="background:#cfc;"
| 1994- || Win ||align=left|  ||  || Réunion || KO (High kick)|| 2 || 

|-  style="background:#fbb;"
| 1979-08-31 || Loss||align=left| Payap Premchai ||  || Bangkok, Thailand || Decision || 5 ||3:00

|-  style="background:#fbb;"
| 1979-03-03 || Loss||align=left| Kaopong Sitichuchai || Lumpinee Stadium || Bangkok, Thailand || Decision || 5|| 3:00

|-  style="background:#cfc;"
| 1979-01-09 || Win ||align=left| Phuchong Saksanguanchom || Lumpinee Stadium || Bangkok, Thailand || Decision || 5 || 3:00

|-  style="background:#fbb;"
| 1978-11-10 || Loss ||align=left| Nongkhai Sor.Prapatsorn || Lumpinee Stadium || Bangkok, Thailand || Decision || 5 || 3:00

|-  style="background:#fbb;"
| 1978-09-15 || Loss ||align=left| Toshio Fujiwara || Lumpinee Stadium || Bangkok, Thailand || Decision || 5 || 3:00

|-  style="background:#cfc;"
| 1978-08-15 || Win ||align=left| Wangprai Rojanasongkram || Lumpinee Stadium || Bangkok, Thailand || Decision || 5 || 3:00

|-  style="background:#fbb;"
| 1976-08-31 || Loss ||align=left| Wangwon Lukmatulee || Lumpinee Stadium || Bangkok, Thailand || Decision || 5 || 3:00

|-  style="background:#fbb;"
| 1976-07-08 || Loss ||align=left| Jocky Sitkanpai || Lumpinee Stadium || Bangkok, Thailand || Decision || 5 || 3:00

|-  style="background:#c5d2ea;"
| 1976-04-06 || Draw ||align=left| Jocky Sitkanpai || Lumpinee Stadium || Bangkok, Thailand || Decision || 5 || 3:00

|-  style="background:#cfc;"
| 1976-05-27 || Win ||align=left| Vicharnnoi Porntawee || Rajadamnern Stadium || Bangkok, Thailand || Decision || 5 || 3:00

|-  style="background:#fbb;"
| 1976-02-26 || Loss ||align=left| Neth Saknarong || Rajadamnern Stadium || Bangkok, Thailand || Decision || 5 || 3:00

|-  style="background:#cfc;"
| 1976-01-30 || Win ||align=left| Wichit Lookbangplasoy || Huamark Stadium || Bangkok, Thailand || Decision || 5 || 3:00

|-  style="background:#cfc;"
| 1975-12-23 || Win ||align=left| Sirimongkol Luksiripat || Lumpinee Stadium || Bangkok, Thailand || Decision || 5 || 3:00

|-  style="background:#cfc;"
| 1975-11-12 || Win||align=left| Khunponnoi Kiatsuriya || Lumpinee Stadium || Bangkok, Thailand || Decision || 5 || 3:00

|- style="text-align:center; background:#cfc;"
|1975-10-14
|Win
| align="left" | Apidej Sit-Hirun
|Lumpinee Stadium
|Bangkok, Thailand
|Decision
|5
|3:00

|-  style="background:#cfc;"
| 1975-09-12 || Win ||align=left| Neth Saknarong || Lumpinee Stadium || Bangkok, Thailand || Decision || 5 || 3:00

|-  style="background:#cfc;"
| 1975-08-14 || Win ||align=left| Narongnoi Kiatbandit || Lumpinee Stadium || Bangkok, Thailand || Decision || 5 || 3:00

|-  style="background:#fbb;"
| 1975-07-08 || Loss||align=left| Khunponnoi Kiatsuriya || Lumpinee Stadium || Bangkok, Thailand || Decision || 5 || 3:00

|-  style="background:#cfc;"
| 1975-06-06 || Win ||align=left| Chalermphon Sor.Tha-it || Lumpinee Stadium || Bangkok, Thailand || Decision || 5 || 3:00

|-  style="background:#cfc;"
| 1975-05-02 || Win ||align=left| Ruengsak Porntawee || Lumpinee Stadium || Bangkok, Thailand || Decision || 5 || 3:00

|-  style="background:#cfc;"
| 1974-10-08 || Win ||align=left| Somsak Sor.Thewasoonthorn || Lumpinee Stadium || Bangkok, Thailand || Decision || 5 || 3:00

|-  style="background:#cfc;"
| 1974-08-22 || Win ||align=left| Bundit Singprakarn || Lumpinee Stadium || Bangkok, Thailand || Decision || 5 || 3:00

|-  style="background:#fbb;"
| 1974-07-26 || Loss||align=left| Khunponnoi Kiatsuriya || Lumpinee Stadium || Bangkok, Thailand || Decision || 5 || 3:00
|-
! style=background:white colspan=9 |

|-  style="background:#cfc;"
| 1974-06-18 || Win ||align=left| Yodsing Por.Payathai || || Bangkok, Thailand || Decision || 5 ||3:00 

|-  style="background:#cfc;"
| 1974-04-05 || Win ||align=left| Huasai Sitiboonlert || Lumpinee Stadium || Bangkok, Thailand || KO (Elbow)|| 4 || 

|-  style="background:#cfc;"
| 1974-03-01 || Win ||align=left| Vicharnnoi Porntawee || Lumpinee Stadium || Bangkok, Thailand || Decision || 5 || 3:00

|-  style="background:#cfc;"
| 1974-02-01 || Win ||align=left| Pansak Kiatjaroenchai || Lumpinee Stadium || Bangkok, Thailand || Decision || 5 || 3:00

|-  style="background:#cfc;"
| 1973-12-14 || Win ||align=left| Somsak Sor.Thewasoonthorn|| || Bangkok, Thailand || Decision || 5 ||3:00 

|-  style="background:#cfc;"
| 1973-10-02 || Win ||align=left| Yodsing Por.Payathai || || Bangkok, Thailand || Decision || 5 ||3:00 
|-
! style=background:white colspan=9 |

|-  style="background:#cfc;"
| 1973-09-12 || Win ||align=left| Muangchon Jeeraphan || Rajadamnern Stadium|| Bangkok, Thailand || Decision || 5 ||3:00 

|-  style="background:#fbb;"
| 1973-07-31 || Loss||align=left| Yodsing Por.Payathai || Lumpinee Stadium || Bangkok, Thailand || Decision || 5 ||3:00 
|-
! style=background:white colspan=9 |
|-  style="background:#cfc;"
| 1973-06-22 || Win ||align=left| Chaiyut Sitiboonlert || Lumpinee Stadium || Bangkok, Thailand || Decision || 5 ||3:00 
|-
! style=background:white colspan=9 |

|-  style="background:#cfc;"
| 1973-05-11 || Win ||align=left| Burengnong Singsornthong ||  || Bangkok, Thailand || Decision || 5 ||3:00 

|-  style="background:#cfc;"
| 1973-04-03 || Win ||align=left| Sorasak Sor.Bukhalo ||  || Bangkok, Thailand || Decision || 5 ||3:00 

|-  style="background:#cfc;"
| 1973-01-23 || Win ||align=left| Bundit Singprakarn || Lumpinee Stadium|| Bangkok, Thailand || KO (High kick)|| 3 || 

|-  style="background:#cfc;"
| 1972-12-04 || Win ||align=left| Nanna Muangsurin || Huamark Stadium || Bangkok, Thailand || KO || 4 || 

|-  style="background:#cfc;"
| 1972-09-29 || Win ||align=left| Taweechai Luedchon || Huamark Stadium || Bangkok, Thailand || Decision || 5 || 3:00

|-  style="background:#cfc;"
| 1972-09-01 || Win ||align=left| Denthoranee Muangsurin ||  || Bangkok, Thailand || Decision || 5 || 3:00

|-  style="background:#cfc;"
| 1972-07-21 || Win ||align=left| Saifah Saengmorakot|| Lumpinee Stadium || Bangkok, Thailand || Decision || 5 || 3:00

|-  style="background:#cfc;"
| 1972-06-27 || Win ||align=left| Fahsai Taweechai || Lumpinee Stadium || Bangkok, Thailand || Decision || 5 || 3:00

|-  style="background:#cfc;"
| 1972-05-30 || Win ||align=left| Thepnarong Kiatsuriya ||  || Bangkok, Thailand || Decision || 5 || 3:00

|-  style="background:#cfc;"
| 1972-05-05 || Win ||align=left| Dejsakda Sornram ||  || Bangkok, Thailand || KO || 3 || 

|-  style="background:#fbb;"
| 1972-04-13 || Loss ||align=left| Nanna Muangsurin ||  || Chonburi, Thailand || KO || 3 || 

|-  style="background:#cfc;"
| 1972-03-14 || Win ||align=left| Norasing Seeda ||  || Bangkok, Thailand || Decision || 5 || 3:00

|-  style="background:#fbb;"
| 1971-12-17 || Loss||align=left| Vicharnnoi Porntawee || Lumpinee Stadium || Bangkok, Thailand || KO || 3 ||

|-  style="background:#cfc;"
| 1971-11-05 || Win ||align=left| Suksawad Srithewet || Lumpinee Stadium || Bangkok, Thailand || Decision || 5 || 3:00
|-
! style=background:white colspan=9 |

|-  style="background:#cfc;"
| 1971-08-14 || Win ||align=left| Songkramchai Kiat Chor.Por|| Lumpinee Stadium || Bangkok, Thailand || Decision || 5 || 3:00

|-  style="background:#cfc;"
| 1971-08-06 || Win ||align=left| Chandet Weerapol || Lumpinee Stadium || Bangkok, Thailand || KO (High kick)|| 4 || 

|-  style="background:#cfc;"
| 1971-07-09 || Win ||align=left| Noknoi Singthanongsak || Lumpinee Stadium || Bangkok, Thailand || Decision || 5 || 3:00

|-  style="background:#cfc;"
| 1971-06-04 || Win ||align=left| Kwanmuang Chitprasert ||  || Bangkok, Thailand || Decision || 5 || 3:00

|-  style="background:#fbb;"
| 1971-04-30 || Loss ||align=left| Samaod Singsornthong ||  || Bangkok, Thailand || Decision || 5 || 3:00

|-  style="background:#cfc;"
| 1971-04-02 || Win ||align=left| Rojsaming Lukprakanong || Huamark Stadium || Bangkok, Thailand || KO || 2 || 

|-  style="background:#cfc;"
| 1971-01-29 || Win ||align=left| Kiatpatum Phanphang-nga || Lumpinee Stadium || Bangkok, Thailand || Decision || 5 || 3:00
|-
! style=background:white colspan=9 |

|-  style="background:#cfc;"
| 1970-12-01 || Win ||align=left| Phalachai Sakwarin || Lumpinee Stadium || Bangkok, Thailand || Decision || 5 || 3:00

|-  style="background:#c5d2ea;"
| 1970-11-13 || Draw ||align=left| Fightta Theparat ||  || Khon Kaen, Thailand || Decision || 5 || 3:00

|-  style="background:#cfc;"
| 1970-10-12 || Win ||align=left| Daengnoi Singnongpho || Rajadamnern Stadium || Bangkok, Thailand || Decision || 5 || 3:00

|-  style="background:#cfc;"
| 1970-09-02 || Win ||align=left| Ritthichai Lukkajao || Rajadamnern Stadium || Bangkok, Thailand || Decision || 5 || 3:00

|-  style="background:#cfc;"
| 1970-08-12 || Win ||align=left| Songkramchai Kiat Chor.Por||  || Khon Kaen, Thailand || Decision || 5 || 3:00

|-  style="background:#cfc;"
| 1970-07-26 || Win ||align=left| Denchai Thailok || Rajadamnern Stadium || Bangkok, Thailand || Decision || 5 || 3:00

|-  style="background:#fbb;"
| 1970-06-22 || Loss ||align=left| Kwanmuang Chitprasert || Rajadamnern Stadium || Bangkok, Thailand || Decision || 5 || 3:00

|-  style="background:#cfc;"
| 1970-05-20 || Win ||align=left| Kraisorn Singkongka || Rajadamnern Stadium || Bangkok, Thailand || Decision || 5 || 3:00

|-  style="background:#cfc;"
| 1970-03-04 || Win ||align=left| Sang Suthising ||  || Ban Prong, Thailand || Decision || 5 || 3:00

|-  style="background:#cfc;"
| 1969-11-17 || Win ||align=left| Chamongdet Songsiam ||  ||  Thailand || Decision || 5 ||3:00

|-  style="background:#cfc;"
| 1969-10-30 || Win ||align=left| Kongsil Thiamkhamhaeng||  || Khon Kaen, Thailand || KO || 1 || 

|-  style="background:#cfc;"
| 1969-10-02 || Win ||align=left| Klairong Lookchaomaesaitong|| Rajadamnern Stadium || Bangkok, Thailand || Decision || 5 ||3:00

|-  style="background:#cfc;"
| 1969-09-11 || Win ||align=left| Somyot ||  ||  Thailand || Decision || 5 ||3:00

|-  style="background:#cfc;"
| 1969-08-13 || Win ||align=left| Khakta Jathamon || Rajadamnern Stadium || Bangkok, Thailand || Decision || 5 ||3:00

|-  style="background:#cfc;"
| 1969-07-30 || Win ||align=left| Truphet Muangsurin|| Rajadamnern Stadium || Bangkok, Thailand || KO || 2 ||

|-  style="background:#cfc;"
| 1969-07-02 || Win ||align=left| Tuanchai Saprasong|| Rajadamnern Stadium || Bangkok, Thailand || Decision || 5 ||3:00

|-  style="background:#cfc;"
| 1969- || Win ||align=left| Saifon Sakdsawan ||  || Khon Kaen, Thailand || KO || 2 || 

|-  style="background:#cfc;"
| 1969-05-01 || Win ||align=left| Singthon Singbatan|| Rajadamnern Stadium || Bangkok, Thailand || KO (High kick)|| 2 || 

|-
| colspan=9 | Legend:

See more
List of Muay Thai practitioners

References

1951 births
Living people
Pudpadnoi Worawut
Pudpadnoi Worawut